was a Japanese professional sumo wrestler from Ehime Prefecture. He was the sport's 39th yokozuna.

Career
He was born  in Nishiuwa District. On his school excursion to Ōita in the spring of 1926, he met future yokozuna Futabayama Sadaji, who had not yet joined Tatsunami stable, and was participating in the track meet. After joining Takasago stable in the autumn of 1927, he met Futabayama again. Subsequently, he and Futabayama practiced together regularly after he entered sumo.

In January 1935 he changed its surname to Maedayama in honour of the surgeon who saved his career after he was forced to sit out the whole of 1934 due to injury.

Maedayama reached the top makuuchi division in January 1937. In May 1938, he was promoted to ōzeki, straight from the fourth komusubi rank, after finishing as tournament runner-up. It was the quickest rise to ōzeki since Ōnishiki in 1916. In January 1941, he defeated ōzeki Haguroyama and yokozuna Futabayama. His strongest technique was harite, or face slap. His technique caused a controversy over harite but Futabayama supported him, insisting it was a legitimate sumo technique.

Maedayama was an ōzeki during the war years, when few tournaments were held, and took his only top division championship in the autumn of 1944, with a 9–1 record. He was promoted to yokozuna in June 1947 after taking part in a three way play-off that also included fellow ōzeki Azumafuji and yokozuna Haguroyama. He was thirty-three years old at the time of his promotion and in his short yokozuna career he was unable to win any further tournament championships, only managing to produce two winning scores. Always a temperamental and controversial figure, he was forced to retire by the Japan Sumo Association in October 1949 after dropping out of a tournament claiming illness, only to be subsequently photographed at a baseball game with Lefty O'Doul.

Retirement from sumo

Maedayama had become head coach of Takasago stable in 1941 while still active in the ring (a practice no longer permitted) and upon his retirement he formally adopted the name Takasago Oyakata. In 1964 he recruited Takamiyama from Hawaii, the first foreigner to succeed in professional sumo. He went on an extended tour of the United States to promote sumo, without the permission of the Sumo Association's directors. He produced yokozuna Asashio Tarō III in 1959 and ōzeki Maenoyama Tarō in 1970. In 1967 he allowed Chiyonoyama's Kokonoe stable into his faction, strengthening the Takasago ichimon (group of stables). He became calmer late in his life and died on August 17, 1971 of cirrhosis of the liver, too early to see Takamiyama become the first foreigner to win a championship in 1972. After his death, foreigners such as ōzeki Konishiki and yokozuna Asashōryū joined his stable.

Career record

    
    
    
    
  
  
    
    
    
    
  

    
    
    
    
  

    
    
    
    
  

Through most of the 1930s and 1940s only two tournaments were held a year, and in 1946 only one was held.

See also
Glossary of sumo terms
List of past sumo wrestlers
List of sumo tournament top division champions
List of yokozuna

References

External links

Japan Sumo Association profile
Article on Maedayama

1914 births
1971 deaths
Japanese sumo wrestlers
Yokozuna
Sumo people from Ehime Prefecture
Deaths from cirrhosis